Vikramnagar is a small railway station in Ujjain city, Madhya Pradesh. Its code is VRG.

Etymology
The Name of the Station is named after The King Vikramaditya of the Ujjaini Kingdom.

Structure and Location

The station lies on the Indore Junction BG–Ujjain Junction BG rail route in Ujjain city. The station consist of two platforms, neither well sheltered. It lacks many facilities including Water and Sanitation. The main railway station of City, Ujjain Junction is always preferred over Vikramnagar station for catching several trains. This station is only suitable for local travelling within Ujjain City.

Trains passing through

There are many trains passing through Vikramnagar but only a few trains stop at Vikramnagar such as :

 Indore–Jaipur Express
 Narmada Express
 Indore–Ujjain Passenger
 Indore–Bhopal Passenger
 Indore–Nagda Passenger

See also

 
 Ujjain
 Avantika
 Indore

References

Railway stations in Ujjain district
Ratlam railway division
Buildings and structures in Ujjain
Transport in Ujjain
Memorials to Vikramaditya
Railway stations in Ujjain
Year of establishment missing